The Zakura And Tengpora Massacre  was the killing of protesters calling for the implementation of a United Nations resolution regarding the plebiscite in Kashmir at Zakura Crossing and Tengpora Bypass Road in Srinagar on 1 March 1990, in which 26 people were killed and 14 injured by Indian forces. It led Amnesty International to issue an appeal for urgent action on Kashmir.

See also

Gawakadal massacre
Sopore massacre
Handwara massacre
Bijbehara massacre
Human rights abuses in Jammu and Kashmir

References

Srinagar
Massacres in 1990
1990 in India
March 1990 events in Asia
March 1990 crimes
1990s in Jammu and Kashmir
Massacres in Jammu and Kashmir